Joan Dowling (6 January 1928 – 31 March 1954) was a British character actress.

Life and career
Dowling was the illegitimate daughter of Vera Dowling. A piece in The Laindon and District Times, on 23 June 2015, written by her cousin John Strickland, says she was born in the house called 'Carlyle', which is one of the turreted bungalows in Laindon High Road North, and brought up by her great-grandmother, Elizabeth Dowling, in Uxbridge. She had a passion for acting, although she was never formally trained, and took roles in small plays, pantomimes and other productions whenever she could. At the age of 14 she approached a London acting agency and was given her first 'proper' part in a small production (title unknown). Her major acting debut came when producer Anthony Hawtrey cast her in the role of Norma Bates in the Joan Temple play No Room at the Inn. The play's first performance was at the Embassy Theatre in July 1945.  Subsequently, the play transferred under producer Robert Atkins to the Winter Garden Theatre, Drury Lane. She also played the same role in the 1948 film version, with the screenplay co-written by the famous Welsh author Dylan Thomas and Ivan Foxwell. She signed her first film contract at the age of 17 for Associated British Pictures.

She was perhaps best known for her role as the tomboy Clarry in the 1947 Ealing Studios production Hue and Cry, a story set among the rubble and buildings of post-war London about a group of school children who discover that crooks have been sending coded messages about forthcoming jobs to their gang using the pages of a children's comic. In 1951 she married Harry Fowler, another actor from the cast of Hue and Cry.

Death
On 31 March 1954, Dowling took her own life in the kitchenette of her home in Farmer Street, Kensington, by gas poisoning.

Filmography

Selected stage roles
No Room at the Inn (1945–47) 
A Midsummer Night's Dream (1950) as Puck

Radio
Meet the Huggetts (1953, series 1. Replaced after her death by Vera Day)

References

External links
 
 Video footage of Joan Dowling at British Pathe News
 Picture: Joan Dowling and Harry Fowler on the set of Hue and Cry

1928 births
1954 suicides
20th-century English actresses
English people of Irish descent
Suicides in Kensington
Actresses from Surrey
Deaths from asphyxiation
English film actresses
English radio actresses
English stage actresses
Suicides by gas
1954 deaths